Raymond Lee Cunningham (January 17, 1905 – July 30, 2005) was an American third baseman in Major League Baseball who played for the St. Louis Cardinals in 1931 and 1932. He batted and threw right-handed. A native of Mesquite, Texas, Cunningham played briefly for the Cardinals at third base before an injury cut short his career. He injured himself, whipping a sidearm throw to first base on a swinging bunt.

Life
Cunningham was a 26-year-old rookie when he joined the Cardinals for the final weeks of the 1931 season. His salary was $500 a year. During his time with St. Louis, Cunningham roomed with two Cardinal legends, Dizzy Dean and Pepper Martin. In a two-season career, Cunningham was a .154 hitter with one RBI and no home runs in 14 games.

Following his retirement as a player, Cunningham worked as a salesman and for an oil company. In 2004, he was recognized as the oldest living former Major League Baseball player. He gained this distinction when a former pitcher for the old Washington Senators and St. Louis Browns, Paul Hopkins, died in 2004 at 99 years of age. Cunningham was honored at the Texas Baseball Hall of Fame with a special plaque celebrating his life in baseball. He remained a baseball fan and kept a daily watch on the Houston Astros.

Cunningham died in Pearland, Texas at 100 years of age. With his death, the distinction of oldest living former major league player moved to Howdy Groskloss.

See also
List of centenarians (Major League Baseball players)
List of centenarians (sportspeople)

External links

Story Scout

1905 births
2005 deaths
Major League Baseball third basemen
St. Louis Cardinals players
Baseball players from Houston
American centenarians
Men centenarians
People from Mesquite, Texas
Sportspeople from the Dallas–Fort Worth metroplex
Dayton Aviators players